Cochran is a city in Bleckley County, Georgia, United States. As of the 2020 census, the city had a population of 5,026. The city is the county seat of Bleckley County.

Cochran is named for Judge Arthur E. Cochran and was incorporated on March 19, 1869. Judge Cochran was largely instrumental in developing this section of Georgia through his work as president of the Macon and Brunswick Railroad, now the Southern Railway (a component of Norfolk Southern Railway). Once known as Dykesboro, Cochran was settled by B. B. Dykes, who owned the site on which the town is built. The earliest settlers located here to work in the turpentine industry.

Cochran is home to Bleckley County High School and Middle Georgia State University. Three properties in Cochran are listed on the National Register of Historic Places: the Bleckley County Courthouse in Courthouse Square, the Cochran Municipal Building and School at the junction of Dykes and Second streets, and Hillcrest at 706 Beech Street.

History
Cochran, originally known as Dykesboro, was settled in the 1850s by B. B. Dykes. It was renamed Cochran in 1869 after Arthur Cochran, a railroad official who brought the Macon and Brunswick Railroad to town. In 1912, Cochran was designated seat of the newly formed Bleckley County.

Government
Cochran operates under a Mayor-Council system of government, with the day-to-day business being handled by a city manager. The city manager is Richard Newburn. The Mayor is Billy Yeomans. The Police Chief is Jeff Trawick, and the fire chief is Brock Wilcher.

In 2016, at a City Council meeting held on October 11, Mayor Michael Stoy resigned from office, alleging that certain City Council members had participated in an illegal meeting. Since there was more than a year remaining in his term, a special election was held to elect another Mayor.

In 2013, the city manager decided to terminate the employment of the police and fire chief, and replace them with a public safety director in order to save money, but rescinded his decision days later amidst public disapproval, and announced the appointment of a task force to look at the budget and advise him on choices.

In 2011, Mayor Cliff Avant was charged with felony theft for allegedly donating city-owned PVC pipe to a local church. He admitted the donation and the mistake of not having it declared surplus property by the city council. On the day of the trial, as a result of a plea deal, Avant resigned as mayor, and pleaded guilty to a charge of criminal trespass.

In 2008, some of the Cochran Police Force came under scrutiny for various acts of misconduct, which included child molestation charges. One officer was charged and another resigned after being investigated for interference with custody.

Geography
Cochran is located at  (32.386646, -83.350684).

The city is located in the central part of the state along U.S. Route 23, which runs from southeast to northwest to the northeast of downtown, leading northwest  to Macon and southeast  to Eastman. Georgia State Route 26 runs from southwest to northeast through the center of the city, leading northeast  to Dudley (after meeting U.S. Route 80), and southwest  to Hawkinsville, concurrent with U.S. Route 129 Alternate.

Demographics

2020 census

As of the 2020 United States Census, there were 5,026 people, 1,406 households, and 814 families residing in the city.

2010 census
As of the 2010 United States Census, there were 5,150 people living in the city. The racial makeup of the city was 48.1% Black, 47.3% White, 0.1% Native American, 1.6% Asian, 0.0% Pacific Islander and 1.0% from two or more races. 1.8% were Hispanic or Latino of any race.

2000 census
As of the census of 2000, there were 4,455 people, 1,632 households, and 1,055 families living in the city. The racial makeup of the city was 55.31% White, 42.09% African American, 0.09% Native American, 1.41% Asian, 0.47% from other races, and 0.63% from two or more races. Hispanic or Latino of any race were 0.99% of the population.

There were 1,632 households, out of which 30.8% had children under the age of 18 living with them, 37.6% were married couples living together, 23.2% had a female householder with no husband present, and 35.3% were non-families. 31.9% of all households were made up of individuals, and 15.6% had someone living alone who was 65 years of age or older. The average household size was 2.44 and the average family size was 3.10.

In the city, the population was spread out, with 26.1% under the age of 18, 15.6% from 18 to 24, 23.4% from 25 to 44, 19.5% from 45 to 64, and 15.4% who were 65 years of age or older. The median age was 33 years. For every 100 females, there were 83.2 males. For every 100 females age 18 and over, there were 78.0 males.

The median income for a household in the city was $25,545, and the median income for a family was $35,854. Males had a median income of $29,434 versus $22,813 for females. The per capita income for the city was $13,354. About 14.8% of families and 21.5% of the population were below the poverty line, including 33.3% of those under age 18 and 23.0% of those age 65 or over.

Education

Bleckley County School District 
Bleckley County students in kindergarten to grade twelve are in the Bleckley County School District, which consists of a primary school, an elementary school, a middle school and a high school. The district has 151 full-time teachers and over 2,355 students.
Bleckley County Learning Center
Bleckley County Primary School
Bleckley County Elementary School
Bleckley County Middle School
Bleckley County Success Academy
Bleckley County High School

Middle Georgia State University 
Middle Georgia State University is a public university with its main campus in Macon, Georgia. It was founded in 2013 through the merger of Middle Georgia College and Macon State College. Middle Georgia College's campus in Cochran is now one of the multiple campuses of Middle Georgia State University.

Tourist attractions 
Cochran-Bleckley Cotton & Peanut Museum
Greene Acres Farm
Terry L. Coleman Museum and Archives

Notable people
Ronald Gray - convicted spree killer
Amberle L. Husbands - writer of pulp-noir and science fiction short stories and novels
 Danny Mathis - Politician and coroner.
Nancye Radmin (1938–2020), American businesswoman, founder of The Forgotten Woman retail chain
Clarence Reid, a.k.a. Blowfly - musician and songwriter
Ed Roberts - Physician and founder of MITS where he created the Altair 8800 microcomputer, starting the microcomputer revolution. It featured Microsoft's first software, the Altair BASIC and employed Bill Gates, Paul Allen, and Monte Davidoff.  
Obie Walker - claimant of the World Colored Heavyweight Championship boxing title in the 1930s

References

External links
 
 Evergreen Baptist Church historical marker
 Longstreet Methodist Church historical marker

Cities in Georgia (U.S. state)
Cities in Bleckley County, Georgia
County seats in Georgia (U.S. state)